Ansula Afa (English: The Kind Father) is a 2016 Bodo Social drama film directed by Rabi Narzary, who also starred in the film. The film was released on 25 June 2016. Its produced by director himself under the banner of R. N. Film Presents. The film stars Esha Basumatary, Rabi Narzary and Dwimu Rani Basumatary in the lead roles.

About
The film story is about two differences religion between Bathou and Christian.

Cast
 Esha Basumatary as Alari
 Rabi Narzary as Swdwn, Mongal
 Dwimu Rani Basumatary as Priskela

Soundtrack
The music of the film is scored by Amar Boro. The songs were sung by Phungja Mushahary, Esha Basumatary and Jiten Basumatary.

See also
 Bodo films

References

2016 films